ESO may refer to:
Employee stock option (also: executive stock option)
Ether Saga Odyssey, a fantasy massively multiplayer online role-playing game
The Elder Scrolls Online, a fantasy massively multiplayer online role-playing game
Existential second-order logic
ESO (motorcycles)
Eso (town), Orhionmwon, Edo State, Nigeria

Organisations 
European Southern Observatory, an astronomical research organisation
 European Standardisation Organisations: CEN (European Committee for Standardization), CENELEC (European Committee for Electrotechnical Standardisation) and ETSI (European Telecommunications Standards Institute)
Ensemble Studios Online
Edmonton Symphony Orchestra
Evergreen Symphony Orchestra, an orchestra in Taiwan
Eteläsuomalainen osakunta, a student nation at the University of Helsinki
Libyan External Security Organisation
External Security Organisation, the Ugandan external secret service
École secondaire d'Oka, a public high school in Oka, Quebec, Canada

Music 
English Symphony Orchestra and English String Orchestra, two related classical orchestral ensembles
Eso-Charis, Christian metal band (and self-titled album)
Bliss n Eso, Australian hip hop group

See also
Esō, also known as Hyechong, a Korean priest who transmitted Buddhism to Japan